Workrave is a free software application intended to prevent computer users from developing or aggravating occupational diseases such as carpal tunnel syndrome, repetitive strain injuries, or myopia.

The software periodically locks the screen while showing an animated character, “Miss Workrave”, walks the user through various stretching exercises, urges them to take a coffee break and sets a daily work time limit after which it automatically triggers an action, such as suspend the machine.

The program is cross-platform and dependent on the GTK+ graphical widget toolkit as well as other GNOME libraries on Linux. It is also available for Microsoft Windows.

See also 

List of repetitive strain injury software
Repetitive strain injury

References

Further reading 
"Operating Your Body at Peak Performance", a Linux Journal column about xwrits, RSIBreak, and Workrave

"How Open Source Saved My Neck", an InternetNews.com column by Sean Michael Kerner about Workrave

External links

Health software
Cross-platform free software
Software that uses GTK
Repetitive strain injury software